Aladin is a 2009 Indian Hindi-language fantasy action comedy film directed by Sujoy Ghosh. The film stars Amitabh Bachchan, Sanjay Dutt, Riteish Deshmukh and Jacqueline Fernandez (in her film debut).

The film performed poorly at the box office.

Plot

The film opens with the family of archeologist Arun Chatterjee, who lives with his wife, Riya, and their baby son, Aladin. When out on a holiday, Arun is attacked by a gang searching for a magic lamp, which Chatterjee has found, but has hidden somewhere. Arun and Riya Chatterjee are murdered; Aladin is raised by his grandfather. After his granddad's death, a now grown-up Aladin Chatterjee (Ritesh Deshmukh) lives in the fictional city of Khwaish (wish). He is lonely, and Kasim (Sahil Khan) and his gang members have bullied Aladin since his childhood. His life changes when Jasmine (Jacqueline Fernandez) enters the city, and Aladin immediately falls for her.

Jasmine arranges a birthday party for Aladin, and as a present, Kasim gives Aladin a magic lamp for his birthday to embarrass him in front of Jasmine. However, this lamp turns out to be the magic lamp that the murderers of Aladin's parents were trying to find. Aladin rubs the lamp and releases the genie, Genius (Amitabh Bachchan). Desperate to grant him three wishes so that his contract with the magic lamp can end, the rock-star Genius suddenly makes Aladin's life very interesting but chaotic. Aladin does not want to make any wish, but Genius enters Aladin's dreams and finds out what he wants, getting his sleeping mind to make a wish: to make Jasmine fall in love with him. When he wakes up, he does not like what Genius has done and uses his second wish to turn Jasmine into normal. His third wish is for Genius to help him woo Jasmine without using magic to make it happen. Genius does his best, but magic is really his strong suit. Still, as a result of Genius's help/interference, Aladin stands up to Kasim and starts a relationship with Jasmine, and Genius teaches Kasim a lesson. Aladin's future looks perfect, until the real threat looms on the horizon - the ex-genie, Ringmaster (Sanjay Dutt).

Ringmaster is searching for the magic lamp and kidnaps Jasmine with the help of his circus gang. Shortly after Genius and Aladin realize that she has been kidnapped, an informer (really Ringmaster in disguise) tells Aladin that it was Genius who murdered his parents. Aladin insults Genius and tells him to leave. Heartbroken, Genius goes to rescue Jasmine alone. As he arrives, it is revealed that Ringmaster is the one who actually killed Aladin's parents, as he has been searching for the magic lamp for a long time; Aladin's parents found it first, and Ringmaster punished them for it. Ringmaster steals the magic lamp and wishes for Genius to kill Aladin, but Genius refuses to do it, and loses his magical powers because he did not grant the wish, just as Ringmaster had planned. Aladin learns that Genius is innocent and arrives to help him, and they succeed in rescuing Jasmine. Ringmaster's plan is then completely revealed: he plans to perform a ritual to steal the reflection of an approaching comet, getting back his genie powers as a result. Genius, Aladdin and Jasmine intervene, and Aladdin steals the comet's reflection, giving genie powers back to Genius instead of Ringmaster. Genius seals Ringmaster inside a mirror and then shatters it, defeating him. The Ringmaster's gang is also defeated.

In the end, the trio happily gets back to the city, Aladin and Jasmine are a couple, and after earning special superpowers from the comet, Aladin gives Kasim yet another lesson.

Cast
 Amitabh Bachchan as Genius
 Sanjay Dutt as Jaffar the Ringmaster
 Riteish Deshmukh as Aladin "Aloo" Chatterjee
 Dev Kantawala as young Aladin
 Jacqueline Fernandez as Jasmine
 Sahil Khan as Kasim Kejriwal
 Ratna Pathak Shah as Marjina
 Victor Banerjee as Mr. Chaterjee
 Joy Sengupta as Arun Chaterjee
 Sohini Ghosh as Riya Chaterjee
 Arif Zakaria as Professor Nazir
 William Ong as Xi Guang Lee
 Erina as Fire Breathing Lady

Awards
 Stardust Awards - Best Female Debut - Jacqueline Fernandez
 IIFA Best Female Debut - Jacqueline Fernandez
 Best Art Direction - Sabu Cyril
 Best Special Effects (Visual) - Charles Darby (Eyecube Labs)

Soundtrack

The music of the film is composed by Vishal–Shekhar, lyrics penned by Vishal Dadlani and Anvita Dutt Guptan (Bachke O Bachke).

Reception

Box office
Aladin grossed an estimated .

Critical response
Taran Adarsh's one star review for Bollywood Hungama stated "On the whole, ALADIN is a terrible waste of a terrific opportunity. Hugely disappointing!." Mayank Shekhar of Hindustan Times stated "At 65, Amitabh Bachchan's on-screen presence is likely to get scarcer with age. Audiences are still interested in his work. If only he wouldn’t green-light unbelievable, hollow, expensive rubbish that’d be pelted on us merely because, he said yes. Kaveree Bamzai writing for India Today said "Despite the Rs 80 crore of special effects wasted on the film, Aladin has neither magic nor is it magical."

See also
 Bollywood films of 2009

References

External links
 
 

2000s Hindi-language films
2009 films
Films based on Aladdin
Films scored by Vishal–Shekhar
Indian fantasy action films
2000s fantasy action films
Genies in film
Films with screenplays by Ritesh Shah
Films directed by Sujoy Ghosh
Films based on One Thousand and One Nights